Moji Makanjuola (MFR) is a Nigerian, veteran journalist and broadcaster. She was a former president of the "Nigerian Association of Women Journalist (NAWOJ) and love"

Background and career
Moji Makanjuola, a Kwara State-born health reporter is one of the Nigerian broadcast journalists who has contributed significantly to the improvement and developments of journalism in Nigeria especially in the area of health journalism.

She is a Media Consultant to the UN Women, who had also worked for decades in the Nigerian Television Authority (NTA) where she rose to the position of head of health and gender desk before her retirement.

She was a pioneer member of the Center for Diseases Control, CDC Atlanta in USA.

Before retiring from NTA, she had earlier worked in the then National Television Broadcast, Kwara State, Nigeria where she was their first television announcer.

Makanjuola was also the Head of the Presentation and Reportorial Units of NTA between 1980 and 1985. After retiring from the Nigeria Television Authority (NTA) as pioneer Head of the Health and Gender Desk, she continued working for NTA on a contract basis. Makanjuola is also a cinematographer and the Chief Executive Officer of Bronz and Onyx, an Integrated Marketing Communications and Strategy Company.

She is a one-time president of Nigerian Association of Women Journalists (NAWOJ). She is the author of a book "Health Journalism: A Journey with Moji Makanjuola", which was launched in December 2012. On the 29th of September, 2014, Aunty Moji as she is fondly called, was among the 305 distinguished Nigerians that was conferred with national honours by President Goodluck Ebele Jonathan of Nigeria.

She was granted a Member of the Order of the Federal Republic (MFR). She is also an Executive Director of International Society of Media in Public Health (ISMP).

Makanjuola was once reported to have used her skillful reporting to correct the perspectives of vaccine cynics in the country

See also
Nigerian Television Authority
Oluremi Oyo
News Agency of Nigeria

References

Nigerian television journalists
Yoruba journalists
People from Kwara State
Living people
Nigerian women journalists
Women television journalists
Year of birth missing (living people)